Rathconrath is a civil parish in County Westmeath, Ireland.

Rathconrath is one of 9 civil parishes in the barony of Rathconrath in the Province of Leinster.

Rathconrath civil parish comprises the village of Rathconrath and 34 townlands.

The neighbouring civil parishes include: Kilmacnevan to the north and east, Templeoran to the east, Churchtown and Mullingar to the south–east, Ballymorin and Conry to the south–west and Piercetown to the north–west.

References

External links
Rathconrath civil parish at the IreAtlas Townland Data Base
Rathconrath civil parish at townlands.ie
Rathconrath civil parish at The Placenames Database of Ireland

Civil parishes of County Westmeath